Upper St. Regis is a small hamlet on New York State Route 30 near Upper St. Regis Lake,  south of Paul Smiths in Franklin County, New York, United States.

Camp Wild Air was listed on the National Register of Historic Places in 1986.

References

Hamlets in New York (state)
Hamlets in Franklin County, New York